Theodore "Spud" Harder (March 7, 1906 – 	February 13, 1994) was an American football and baseball coach and college athleticdirector. He served as the head football coach at Santa Barbara State College—now known as the University of California, Santa Barbara—from 1934 to 1940, compiling a record of 33–27–6. Harder was also the head baseball coach at Santa Barbara from 1935 to 1948 and again from 1950 to 1951. He was the school's athletic director from 1949 to 1956. Harder Stadium on the on the campus of the University of California, Santa Barbara in Santa Barbara, California was named his honor in 1981.

A native of Bakersfield, California, Harder graduated from Bakersfield High School in 1925. He played college football as an end at Stanford University under head coach Pop Warner from 1926 to 1928. Harder began his coaching career in 1929 at Bakersfield Junior College—now known as Bakersfield College.

Head coaching record

College football

References

External links
 

1906 births
1994 deaths
American football ends
UC Santa Barbara Gauchos athletic directors
UC Santa Barbara Gauchos baseball coaches
UC Santa Barbara Gauchos football coaches
Stanford Cardinal football players
Coaches of American football from California
Players of American football from Bakersfield, California
Baseball coaches from California